Karolína Muchová (born 21 August 1996) is a Czech professional tennis player. She has a career-high singles ranking of world No. 19, achieved on 17 May 2021. Muchová has reached two finals on the WTA Tour, winning one title, the International-level Korea Open in 2019.

Muchová turned professional in 2013. She first rose to prominence at the 2018 US Open, defeating world No. 12 and two-time major champion Garbiñe Muguruza in the second round. The following year, Muchová would reach her first major quarterfinal at Wimbledon by upsetting world No. 3 and tournament favourite Karolína Plíšková. At the 2021 Australian Open, she reached the semifinals by defeating world No. 1 and home favorite Ashleigh Barty, but then lost to Jennifer Brady.

Early life and background
Karolína Muchová was born on the 21st of August 1996 in Olomouc. Her father is former Czech footballer Josef Mucha. He introduced her to tennis at the age of seven. She also has a brother, with whom she did many sports when they were kids. Since there were tennis courts near her home, she decided to pick up a tennis racquet, and then when she was about 12, she chose tennis over handball. She moved to train in Prague in 2019. She stated that her tennis idol growing up was Roger Federer. She struggled with a lot of injuries during her junior years.

Professional career

2013–18: Breakthrough

Muchová began playing on the ITF Women's Circuit in October 2013 at the age of 17. Her first tournament was a $10k event in Dubrovnik, where she reached the second round. In July the following year, she won her first ITF title in Michalovce, Slovakia. She then started to produce low-performances until March 2016, when she won her second singles ITF title at Sharm El Sheikh, and two weeks later another event at the same venue. In July 2017, she reached the final of the $75k event ITS Cup in Olomouc, losing there to her countrymate Markéta Vondroušová. She then made her WTA Tour main-draw debut at the 2017 Korea Open after defeating two low-ranked players, and then lost in the first round of the main-draw to Priscilla Hon. She made her main-draw debut at a major event at the 2018 US Open winning three qualifying matches. After winning her opening-match against Dayana Yastremska, Muchová upset two-time Grand Slam champion and 12th seed Garbiñe Muguruza in the second round to score her first top-20 victory, advancing to the third round of the tournament. In the third round, she lost to Ashleigh Barty.

2019: First Wimbledon quarterfinal, first WTA title, top 30 debut

She started the 2019 season with a first-round loss at the Australian Open, losing to Karolína Plíšková. She then at the Premier-level Qatar Ladies Open made her first WTA Tour quarterfinal, after defeating Samantha Stosur and Hsieh Su-wei, but then lost to seed No. 4, Elina Svitolina. At the Miami Open, she debuted at the Premier Mandatory level-tournaments but was eliminated in the second round by Angelique Kerber. Her first tour-level final came at the Prague Open, where she lost to Jil Teichmann. Her performance was enough to take her for the first time into the top 100 of the WTA rankings. In June, she beat Anett Kontaveit to reach the second round of the French Open, where she lost to Irina-Camelia Begu. In July, she reached quarterfinals of the Wimbledon Championships, beating third seed countrywoman Karolína Plíšková 13–11 in the final set of their fourth-round match, which lasted over three hours. She became the first player to reach the quarterfinals at her Wimbledon debut since Li Na in 2006. In the quarterfinal, Muchová lost to Elina Svitolina. She followed this with a quarterfinal at the Bronx Open and third round of the US Open, where she was beat by Serena Williams. Her maiden WTA Tour title came at 2019 Korea Open, where she defeated Magda Linette in the final. Muchová then continued with good results, reaching semifinals of the Premier-level Kremlin Cup, in which she lost to Anastasia Pavlyuchenkova. At the end of the year, she debuted at the WTA Elite Trophy with success in her round-robin group, defeating two Americans, Sofia Kenin and Alison Riske, but later lost to Aryna Sabalenka in the semifinal. She finished the year as world No. 21.

2020: Mixed results, US Open fourth round
In 2020, Muchová produced rather mixed results. She reached the second round of the Australian Open for the first time in her career. There she lost to CiCi Bellis in straight-sets. She then played for the first time at the Qatar Open, where she also recorded her first win over Magda Linette, but lost to seventh seed Kiki Bertens in the second round. After the six month suspension of the WTA Tour due to COVID-19 pandemic, she first played at the Cincinnati Open where she beat qualifier Ann Li in the first round, before she lost to Naomi Osaka. Her best performance of the season came at the US Open, when she beat Venus Williams Anna Kalinskaya, and Sorana Cîrstea to reach her first round of 16 there but then lost to Victoria Azarenka. By the end of the year, Muchová reached only the first round of the French Open and the second round of the Ostrava Open. However, she spent the whole year inside the top 30.

2021: Australian Open semifinal, top 20 debut, second Wimbledon quarterfinal
Muchová reached the semifinals of the Australian Open, beating world No. 1, Ashleigh Barty, but lost to Jennifer Brady in three sets.

After reaching the quarterfinals of the Madrid Open defeating second seed Naomi Osaka and 16th seed Maria Sakkari, her first showing at the WTA 1000 quarterfinal level, Muchová reached a career-high of world No. 19 on 17 May 2021. Two weeks later in June, her good form continued when she got to the third round of the French Open also for the first time in her career.

Seeded 19th at Wimbledon, Muchová reached the quarterfinals for the second time, defeating 30th seed Paula Badosa. Muchová was only the third woman in Wimbledon history to reach the quarterfinals on her first two appearances at the event (2019 and 2021).

The 22nd seeded Muchová was ousted in the first round of the US Open by Sara Sorribes Tormo in straight sets.

2022: Hiatus due to injury, second French Open third round & top-5 win, out of top 100
She didn't play at the Australian Open because of an injury. As a result, her ranking dropped out of top 50.

Muchová came back in Miami as an unseeded player. In the first round, she defeated fellow Tereza Martincová in two tie-break sets. Then, she defeated 18th seed Leylah Fernandez, before withdrawing from her third-round match against Naomi Osaka.

In Madrid, she played using protected ranking, defeating Chinese teenager Zheng Qinwen before she lost to 11th seed Belinda Bencic.

Ranked No. 81 at the French Open, her form improved substantially as she was able to reach the third round, defeating fourth seed and 2021 semifinalist Maria Sakkari in the second round, in straight sets, for the biggest win of her career and her fourth top-5 win.

Despite these improvements in form, she finished the year outside of the top 100 at world No. 149.

2023: Two WTA 1000 quarterfinals, Back to top 55
Using her protected ranking she returned to the 2023 Australian Open and reached the second round, as well as the quarterfinals at the 2023 Dubai Tennis Championships where in the latter she withdrew from the quarterfinal match, reaching back the top 80 on 27 February 2023 after raising 35 positions.

At the 2023 BNP Paribas Open also using protected ranking, she reached the fourth round defeating Yulia Putintseva, 14th seed Viktoria Azarenka and 23rd seed Martina Trevisan. Next she defeated Markéta Vondroušová to reach her third quarterfinal of the season and the second on a WTA 1000 level since Dubai. As a result she moved back into the top 55 raising 20 positions in the rankings.

Playing style

Muchová is an aggressive all-court player, possessing an intelligent game with exceptional variety. She has powerful groundstrokes from both wings, using both her forehand and backhand to hit winners from any position on the court. She has been praised for her ability to incorporate softer shots, such as drop shots, lobs, and sliced backhands, into her game, constantly breaking up the pace of baseline rallies, and being able to hit winners with these typically defensive shots. Muchová is also proficient at defending her second serve. Her footwork, speed, and anticipation allow her to be one of the strongest return players on the WTA Tour. As a result of her exemplary fitness, she is capable of sustaining long rallies, and is an effective counterpuncher, extending rallies until she can create an opportunity to hit a winner. Due to her doubles experience, Muchová is a strong net player, and is one of the strongest volleyers on tour, frequently approaching the net to finish off points. Throughout 2019, her breakout season, she was praised for her style of play by Mats Wilander, who stated that she could "achieve great things". With her on-court demeanour, fluid style, grace, and variety, she has been compared by some commentators to Justine Henin and Roger Federer.

Endorsements
Muchová is sponsored by Adidas for her clothing, and by Head for her rackets.

Career statistics

Grand Slam singles performance timeline

References

External links
 
 

1996 births
Living people
Czech female tennis players
Sportspeople from Olomouc
21st-century Czech women